American singer Max has released three studio albums, five extended plays, 39 singles, seven promotional singles and nine other album appearances.

Studio albums

Extended plays

Singles

As lead artist

As featured artist

Promotional singles

Other charted songs

Guest appearances

As Party Pupils

EP

Compilations albums

Singles

As lead artists

As featured artists

Guest appearances

Notes

References

Schneider, Max